Molly Worthen (born 1981) is a journalist and historian of American religion. Raised in Glen Ellyn, Illinois, she graduated from Yale in 2003 and earned a Ph.D. in American religious history there in 2011. She is a contributing opinion writer for The New York Times.

Her first book, The Man on Whom Nothing Was Lost, a biography of American diplomat and Yale professor Charles Hill, was published in 2006 and reviewed by The Boston Globe and Michiko Kakutani in The New York Times.  Her most recent book, Apostles of Reason, examines the history of American evangelicalism since 1945.

Her work has appeared in The New York Times, Slate, Time, The Boston Globe, The New Republic, The Dallas Morning News, and the Toledo Blade. She is an associate professor of history at the University of North Carolina at Chapel Hill.

Further reading
From The New York Times: Lecture Me. Really.

Extract from The Man on Whom Nothing Was Lost in the Yale Alumni Magazine: Man & Myth at Yale

Kakutani's review in The New York Times:  From Student and Teacher to Biographer and Subject

From The New York Times Magazine:  Onward Christian Scholars

From The New York Times Magazine:  Who Would Jesus Smack Down?

From  Christianity Today: The Reformer (full text at archive.org)

From  Church History: Chalcedon problem: Rousas John Rushdoony and the origins of Christian reconstructionism

See also
 List of biographers

References

External links

 Personal Website
Faculty Page at the University of North Carolina at Chapel Hill

Yale University alumni
American biographers
People from Glen Ellyn, Illinois
1981 births
Living people
University of North Carolina at Chapel Hill faculty
Historians from Illinois